An election for all seven members of the Federal Council, the government of Switzerland, was held on 14 December 2011, following the federal election on 23 October 2011. Micheline Calmy-Rey announced she would not run for re-election to the council. According to a traditional informal convention, the successor has to come from the French-speaking or Italian-speaking part of Switzerland. The candidates for her post announced by their respective cantonal sections are Alain Berset (Fribourg), Pierre-Yves Maillard (Vaud), Stéphane Rossini (Valais), and Marina Carobbio (Ticino).

Berset and Maillard were favourites. Jean Studer, Liliane Maury Pasquier and Elisabeth Baume-Schneider declined to stand in the election. In the end, the SP decided to nominate Berset and Maillard.

Apart from Calmy-Rey's successor, the controversial aspects of the election included, whether the SVP would hold their seat or gain another, which they had lost after one of their incumbents defected to the BDP; and whether the CVP or the FDP would gain the second seat held by the FDP, which both lay claim to.

The SVP's possible candidates are Heinz Tännler (Zug), Bruno Zuppiger (Zürich), Jakob Stark (Thurgau), Guy Parmelin (Vaud) and Hannes Germann (Schaffhausen). Jean-François Rime (Fribourg) was unofficially nominated, as well. Rime and Zuppiger were nominated as the SVP's candidates; after a scandal involving Zuppiger's professional activities emerged very shortly after the nomination meeting, Hansjörg Walter (Thurgau) was nominated in his stead.

Candidates
The following candidates participated in the election:
Incumbents, in descending order of seniority:
Doris Leuthard (CVP), from Aargau, head of the Federal Department of Environment, Transport, Energy and Communications,
Eveline Widmer-Schlumpf (BDP), from Grisons, head of the Federal Department of Finance,
Ueli Maurer (SVP), from Zurich, head of the Federal Department of Defence, Civil Protection and Sports,
Didier Burkhalter (FDP), from Neuchâtel, head of the Federal Department of Home Affairs,
Simonetta Sommaruga (SPS), from Bern, head of the Federal Department of Justice and Police,
Johann Schneider-Ammann (FDP), from Bern, head of the Federal Department of Economic Affairs,
(Micheline Calmy-Rey (SPS), from Geneva, head of the Federal Department of Foreign Affairs decided not to seek re-election)

Other candidates nominated by their party:
 Alain Berset (SPS), from Fribourg, a member of the Council of States, was nominated by his party to contest the election of the former Micheline Calmy-Rey's seat.
 Jean-François Rime (SVP), from Fribourg, a member of the National Council, was nominated by his party to contest the election of Eveline Widmer-Schlumpf's, Simonetta Sommaruga's, Johann Schneider-Ammann's and the former Micheline Calmy-Rey's seats.
 Hansjörg Walter (SVP), from Thurgau, a member of the National Council, was nominated by his party to contest the election of Eveline Widmer-Schlumpf's seat.
 Pierre-Yves Maillard (SPS), from Vaud, a member of the Council of State of Vaud, was nominated by his party to contest the election of the former Micheline Calmy-Rey's seat.
Other candidates receiving at least 10 votes:
 Luc Recordon (GPS), from Vaud, a member of the Council of States
 Marina Carobbio (SPS), from Ticino, a member of the National Council

Results 
Results:

Seat held by Doris Leuthard 
Doris Leuthard was re-elected during the first ballot. Her re-election was supported by all parliamentary groups.

Seat held by Eveline Widmer-Schlumpf 

Eveline Widmer-Schlumpf was re-elected during the first ballot. Her re-election was supported by all parliamentary groups except that of the SVP and part of the FDP.

Seat held by Ueli Maurer 

Ueli Maurer was re-elected during the first ballot. His re-election was supported by all parliamentary groups except the GPS

Seat held by Didier Burkhalter 

Didier Burkhalter was re-elected during the first ballot. His re-election was supported by all parliamentary groups.

Seat held by Simonetta Sommaruga 

Simonetta Sommaruga was re-elected during the first ballot. Her re-election was supported by all parliamentary groups except that of SVP

Seat held by Johann Schneider-Ammann 

Johann Schneider-Ammann  was re-elected during the first ballot. His re-election was supported by all parliamentary groups except that of SVP

Vacant Seat 
A vacant seat was to be filled following the retirement of Micheline Calmy-Rey(SPS).
Alain Berset (SPS) was elected in the second round. His election was supported by all parliamentary groups except that of SVP

References

Federal Council
2011